Nicolas Félix Deltour (8 September 1822, Paris – 12 November 1904) was a 19th-century French latinist, educated at the Lycée Louis-le-Grand and the École normale supérieure. He then taught at various schools, was appointed academy inspector in 1871, Cabinet Secretary in the Ministry of Public Instruction in 1875 and served from 1879 as Inspector General of lower education.

Works 
  De Sallustio Catonis imitatore, seu quid, in scriptis C. Crispi Sallustii, ad imitationem M. Porcii Catonis censorii referri possit (1859). Paris, éd. Durand
 Les ennemis de Racine au XVIIe siècle. Didier et Durand, Paris 1857 
 (in coll. with Charles Rinn) Choix de morceaux traduits des auteurs latins (Hachette, 1887) 
 Histoire de la littérature romaine, éditions Charles Delagrave, Paris (1887-1889)

Sources 

French Latinists
Lycée Louis-le-Grand alumni
École Normale Supérieure alumni
Literary historians
Grammarians from France
1822 births
Writers from Paris
1904 deaths